Overfield may refer to:
Overfield (Band)
Overfield Township, Wyoming County, Pennsylvania
Overfield, West Virginia

People with the name Overfield
Al Overfield
Jackie Overfield
Pete Overfield